Contraband in coal mines means items which not allowed to be taken underground in a coal mine because if there is firedamp about they may start a fire or explosion. This includes: matches, tobacco and other smoking materials, anything that may cause sparks, anything with electric components except what has been safety-approved. They have to be declared before going down and left there, and collected after coming out of the mine.

References

Coal mining